The 1985 Individual Ice Speedway World Championship was the 20th edition of the World Championship  The Championship was held on 9 and 10 March 1985 in Assen in the Netherlands.

The winner was Vladimir Sukhov of the Soviet Union.Yuri Ivanov defeated former champion Erik Stenlund in the run-off for bronze.

Classification

See also 
 1985 Individual Speedway World Championship in classic speedway
 1985 Team Ice Racing World Championship

References 

Ice speedway competitions
World